Samuel James Donaldson (March 12, 1856 – March 14, 1926) was a farmer, rancher, police officer and political figure in Saskatchewan, Canada. He represented Prince Albert County and then Shellbrook in the Legislative Assembly of Saskatchewan from 1905 to 1915 as a Provincial Rights-Conservative MLA and Prince Albert in the House of Commons of Canada from 1915 to 1917 as a Conservative MP.

He was born in Appleton, Canada West, the son of Samuel Donaldson. After completing his education, he worked as a clerk in a furniture store in Ottawa. In 1876, joined the North-West Mounted Police and travelled west to Pelly, Saskatchewan. Donaldson was a member of the force from 1876 to 1882, serving in Battleford, Prince Albert and Qu'Appelle. He served as a captain in the Prince Albert Volunteers during the North-West Rebellion. After he retired from the Mounted Police, he entered the livery business. In 1882, he married Jessie Paterson.

Donaldson served on the council for Prince Albert from 1889 to 1908 and was mayor from 1892 to 1894. He was elected to the House of Commons in a 1915 by-election held after James McKay was named to the bench. During World War I, Donaldson was lieutenant-colonel for the 188th Battalion, Canadian Expeditionary Force.

Electoral record

References 

Members of the House of Commons of Canada from Saskatchewan
Conservative Party of Canada (1867–1942) MPs
Saskatchewan Provincial Rights Party MLAs
Mayors of Prince Albert, Saskatchewan
1855 births
1938 deaths
20th-century Canadian politicians
19th-century Canadian politicians